Hrishikesh Joshi, born in Kolhapur, is a Marathi actor. He has acted in numerous Hindi, Marathi Movies, tele-serials and theater and has won applauds from many noted professionals.
He has acted in award-winning films like Harishchandrachi Factory, Yellow (2014 film), Aajcha Divas Majha, Vishnupant Damle : The Unsung Hero Of Talkies, Deool

Hrishikesh Joshi completed his post graduation from National School of Drama, in 1997 Acted in more than 50 plays in Hindi, Marathi and Sanskrit
Represented India for Sri Lankan Theatre Festival in which performed ‘ Abhigyan Shakuntalam’  in Sanskrit in Columbo and Candy.

Best Actor Award from Maharashtra state government for Commercial Play State Competition (1999-2000) for the play Shobhayatra, (2006-2007) for Love story and (2007-2008) for 'Ye Bhau Doka Nako Khau' More than 400 shows for commercial play Mukkampost Bombilwadi  More than 150 shows  for commercial play Sangeet Lagnakallol. More than 150 shows  for commercial play Marathi play Love Story

He also writes for a column in the famous Marathi newspaper, Loksatta

Filmography

Films

Marathi Serials

Awards
 Best Actor Award from Maharashtra state government for Commercial Play State Competition (1999-2000) for Shobhayatra
 Best Actor Award from Maharashtra state government for Commercial Play State Competition (2006-2007) for Love story
 Best Actor Award from Maharashtra state government for Commercial Play State Competition (2007-2008) for Ey bhau doka nako khau

References

Male actors from Maharashtra
Living people
Male actors in Marathi cinema
People from Kolhapur
20th-century Indian male actors
21st-century Indian male actors
Year of birth missing (living people)